The 1970 United States Senate election in Nevada was held on November 3, 1970. Incumbent Democratic U.S. Senator Howard Cannon won re-election to a third term.

General election

Candidates
Howard Cannon, incumbent U.S. Senator (Democratic)
Harold G. DeSellem (American Independent)
William Raggio, Washoe County District Attorney (Republican)

Campaign
In the Senate, Cannon was known as a moderate in the Democratic Party. He served as chairman of several committees, including the rules committee and the inaugural arrangements committee. Cannon was nearly defeated for re-election in 1964 by Republican Lieutenant Governor Paul Laxalt in one of the closest elections in history. However, he became more popular over the next few years and defeated D.A. William Raggio, whose 1970 senate campaign began his long political career. Raggio ran for the Nevada Senate in 1972 and won, serving until 2011.

Results

See also 
 1970 United States Senate elections

References

Nevada
1970
United States Senate